Folldal is a municipality in Innlandet county, Norway. It is located in the traditional district of Østerdalen. The administrative centre of the municipality is the village of Folldal. The municipality was established in 1914 when it was separated from Alvdal Municipality.

Folldal is bordered on the north by Oppdal and Tynset municipalities, in the east by Alvdal municipality, in the south by Stor-Elvdal, Sør-Fron and Sel municipalities, and in the west by Dovre municipality. Mining at the Folldal mines was the main industry for Folldal's residents from the 18th century until the last mine related operation in 1993.

The  municipality is the 79th largest by area out of the 356 municipalities in Norway. Folldal is the 301st most populous municipality in Norway with a population of 1,530.

General information

Historically, the parish of Folldal was a part of Alvdal Municipality since 1838 (see Formannskapsdistrikt law). On 1 January 1914, the parish of Folldal was separated from Alvdal to become a separate municipality. Initially, Folldal had a population of 2,284. On 1 January 1970, the three western farms at Børgsungsætri (population: 11) were transferred from the neighboring Dovre Municipality (in Oppland county) to Folldal Municipality (in Hedmark county). On 28 September 1990, a small, unpopulated part of Sør-Fron Municipality (in Oppland county) was transferred to Folldal Municipality (in Hedmark county).

Name
The municipality is named after the old Folldal farm since the first Folldal Church was built there. The first element of the name comes from the name of the local river  and the last element is the Norwegian word  which means "valley" or "dale". The meaning of the river name is unknown (perhaps "the broad one"). Historically, the area name was spelled Foldalen, but more recently it has been spelled Folldal.

Coat of arms
The coat of arms was granted on 21 September 1988. The arms show a gold-colored pickaxe on a red background. This was chosen to represent mining and agriculture in the municipality. There was mining activity in the Folldal area from 1748 until 1993.

Churches
The Church of Norway has two parishes within the municipality of Folldal. It is part of the Nord-Østerdal prosti (deanery) in the Diocese of Hamar.

The main Folldal Church was historically a satellite church of the nearby Lesja Church, as was the church at the iron ore mines at Lesjaverk (Lesja Iron Works). Per Berg reports, "When the sexton Ola Kring died in Lesja in 1751, Frederik Wiborg was appointed sexton there and was presented to the congregation on the third Sunday following Trinity. There certainly wasn't anything very special about being a teacher in Ringsaker, if he was willing to change that for being a sexton. No house or land went with the post and the work was hard. In the Lesja parish there were three satellite churches - Lesjeverk, Dovre, and Folldal. The travel distances were great and it could be very difficult in the winter."

History
  
Mining has been important to Folldal's development from the 18th century to the present. The Folldal works was founded in 1748. Folldal's main copper mine, also opened in 1748. The mine employed up to 550 people. Until 1878, ore was transported by horse-drawn vehicles to the Lovise smelter located in neighboring Alvdal municipality. From 1878 to 1906 there was a lull in operations. The main mine played out and was closed in 1941. Smelting continued using ore from several other deposits in the area until 1968. The business was closed in 1993.

Government
All municipalities in Norway, including Folldal, are responsible for primary education (through 10th grade), outpatient health services, senior citizen services, unemployment and other social services, zoning, economic development, and municipal roads. The municipality is governed by a municipal council of elected representatives, which in turn elects a mayor.  The municipality falls under the Østre Innlandet District Court and the Eidsivating Court of Appeal.

Municipal council
The municipal council  of Folldal is made up of 17 representatives that are elected to four year terms. The party breakdown of the council is as follows:

Mayor
The mayors of Folldal (incomplete list):
2019–present: Kristin Langtjernet (Ap)
2015–2019: Hilde F. Tveråen (Ap)
2011-2015: Egil Eide (Sp)
2003-2011: Eva Tørhaug (Ap)
1999-2003: Hans Einar Thompson (Ap)
1987-1999: Erling Brandsnes (Ap)

Geography

Folldal is located along the northern border of Innlandet county. It is bordered in the northwest by Oppdal (in Trøndelag county). The rest of the surrounding municipalities are all in Innlandet county. The municipality of Tynset lies to the northeast, Alvdal is to the east, Stor-Elvdal is to the southeast, Sør-Fron and Sel are to the south, and Dovre is to the west.

Folldal Municipality is notable because the village of Folldal, its administrative center, has the highest elevation ( above sea level) of all administrative centres in Norway. The village has picturesque scenery with mountains and valleys. The village lies at the foot of Rondeslottet mountain and Snøhetta mountain.

The area also has many interesting geologic features from the last Ice Age. The Einunndalen valley is still actively used for summer grazing at the seters (mountain summer farms) established in the 1700s. Almost half of the municipal land is protected as conservation areas and national parks, including parts that are included in the Rondane National Park and Dovre National Park.

A national tourist road, the Norwegian County Road 27, runs through the municipality.

Climate
Folldal has a subarctic climate (Dfc) with short, cool summers and long, cold winters.

Outdoors
Folldal offers a wide variety of outdoor activities. Hiking is good with marked trails and several cabins to visit. Fishing can be done in the rivers Folla, Einunna, or Glomma. The opportunities for hunting in the area are also good.

Notable people 

 Ivar Mortensson-Egnund (1857–1934) a Norwegian author, journalist, theologian, researcher, translator, writer, philosopher and advocate of nynorsk, lived at Einabu in Folldal from 1894
 Olav Dalgard (1898 in Folldal – 1980) a literary and art historian, filmmaker, author and educator 
 Tore Segelcke (1901–1979) an actress, from 1959 she spent many summers in Folldal 
 Olav Odden (1914 in Folldal – 1969) a Norwegian skier, competed in cross-country skiing and Nordic combined at the 1948 Winter Olympics
 Erling Brandsnes (born 1945 in Folldal) a Norwegian politician Mayor of Folldal  1987-1999
 Hans Einar Krokan (born 1945 in Folldal) a Norwegian physician and cancer researcher
 Svein Borkhus (born 1955 in Dalholen) a Norwegian politician, Mayor of Folldal 1999-2007 and from 2011

References

External links

Municipal fact sheet from Statistics Norway 
Folldal Verk
Folldalsportalen 

 
Municipalities of Innlandet
1914 establishments in Norway